The Saint may refer to:

Fiction 
 Simon Templar, also known as "The Saint", the protagonist of a book series by Leslie Charteris and subsequent adaptations:
 The Saint (film series) (1938–43), starring Louis Hayward, George Sanders and Hugh Sinclair as Simon Templar
 The Saint (radio program) (1944–51), a radio program starring Vincent Price
 The Saint (comics) (1948–61), a long-running comic strip series 
 The Saint (TV series) (1962–69), a British television series starring Roger Moore
 Return of the Saint (1978–79), a British television series starring Ian Ogilvy
 The Saint in Manhattan 1987 TV pilot starring Andrew Clarke as Simon Templar, it was shown as part of CBS Summer Playhouse, a series that aired unsold TV pilots.
 The Saint (TV film series) (1989-90) six made-for-syndication TV Films starring Simon Dutton as Simon Templar, broadcast as part of Mystery Wheel of Adventure.
 The Saint: The Brazilian Connection 
 The Saint: The Blue Dulac 
 Fear in Fun Park, a.k.a. The Saint in Australia 
 The Saint: Wrong Number 
 The Saint: The Big Bang 
 The Saint: The Software Murders 
 The Saint (1997 film), 1997 American film starring Val Kilmer
 The Saint (soundtrack), a soundtrack album from the 1997 film
 The Saint (novel), a novelization of the 1997 film, by Burl Barer
 The Saint (2017 film), 2017 espionage thriller TV movie directed by Ernie Barbarash and starring Adam Rayner in the title role.
 The Saint (1941 film), a 1941 Bollywood film directed by Abdul Rashid Kardar
 "The Saint" (Law & Order: Criminal Intent), an episode of Law & Order: Criminal Intent
 The Saint, an omnibus edition of the Gaunt's Ghosts novels, Honour Guard through Sabbat Martyr, by Dan Abnett

Music 
The Saints (Australian band), an Australian punk band
The Saints (1960s band), an English instrumental band
The Saint (Asbury Park, New Jersey), a club showcasing live, original music

Songs
"The Saint" (Edwin Astley song), original theme to the 1960s TV series
"The Saint" (Orbital song), a song by Orbital from the 1997 film soundtrack of the same title and based upon the 1960s TV theme.
"The Saint" (Thompson Twins song), 1991

Media 
 Play Radio (Hampshire), a radio station formerly known as "The Saint"
 WVCR-FM, Siena College radio station branded "88.3 The Saint"
 The Saint (UK newspaper), a student newspaper at the University of St. Andrews, St. Andrews, United Kingdom

Nickname 
 Ian St John (1938–2021), Scottish football player nicknamed "The Saint"
 Lynn St. John (1876–1950), American college multi-sports coach and administrator nicknamed "The Saint"
 No. 16 Squadron RAF, nicknamed "The Saints"

Other uses 
 The Saint (New York City), a gay nightclub in New York City that operated from 1980 to 1990

See also 
 Saint (disambiguation)
 Santo (disambiguation)